Agonum errans is a species of ground beetle from Platyninae subfamily, that can be found in North Dakota, United States and Alberta, Canada.

References

External links
Agonum errans on Bug Guide

Beetles described in 1823
Beetles of North America
errans